Hasan Hamdan is a Lebanese actor. and voice actor.

Filmography

Film 

Online - Zaki + Creator. 2011 (short)

Television 

Darb Al-Yasamin. 2015
Ain El Jawza. 2015
Bab Almorad
Sanaoud Baad Kalil. 2013
Goodness Road. 1998
Arabic Language Club. 1998

Dubbing roles 
 1001 Nights
 Alice in Wonderland - Cheshire Cat (Classical Arabic version)
 M.I. High
 Saint Mary
 The Men of Angelos

References

External links 

Living people
Lebanese male actors
Lebanese male voice actors
Lebanese male television actors
21st-century Lebanese male actors
Year of birth missing (living people)